Jackson Palmer (1867 – 13 August 1919) was the Member of Parliament for Waitemata and Ohinemuri, in the North Island of New Zealand.

Early life
Born in Belfast, Ireland, Palmer came to New Zealand as an infant. He was educated at Auckland Grammar School and was a lawyer at Paeroa. Later, Jackson Palmer was chief judge of the Native Land Court.

Member of Parliament

In  Palmer stood for Parliament unsuccessfully in the  electorate. In-between he unsuccessfully contested a by-election for the Waitemata seat in 1894, which was won by future Prime Minister William Massey.

For his entire political career Palmer was an Independent Liberal. He declined the Premier John Ballance's invitation to join the Council of the Liberal Federation in 1891.

Palmer died in Wellington on 13 August 1919, and was buried at Karori Cemetery.

References

|-

1867 births
1919 deaths
Independent MPs of New Zealand
Māori Land Court judges
19th-century New Zealand judges
Irish emigrants to New Zealand (before 1923)
University of Auckland alumni
Members of the New Zealand House of Representatives
Unsuccessful candidates in the 1893 New Zealand general election
Unsuccessful candidates in the 1902 New Zealand general election
Unsuccessful candidates in the 1896 New Zealand general election
Unsuccessful candidates in the 1887 New Zealand general election
New Zealand MPs for Auckland electorates
New Zealand MPs for North Island electorates
People educated at Auckland Grammar School
Burials at Karori Cemetery
19th-century New Zealand politicians